Damang Island (alternatively romanized as Damang Dao, Damang, Taimong, Ta-mang, Ta-wang) is an uninhabited island off the southern coast of Guangdong province in the People's Republic of China.

Administratively, this sub-tropical island belongs to the prefecture-level city of Zhuhai, and may be considered part of the so-called Chinese Riviera. It serves as an ecotourism destination, and a research station for the study of its well-preserved ecosystem. The many varieties of rare plant and animal species in its tropical rain forest, include 600 kinds of ornamental plants, such as Podocarpus, Syzygium, Emblica, and 10 kinds of rare wild animals including deer, monkeys and turtles.

Its name is derived from the abundance of mango trees on the island.

References

Islands of Zhuhai
Uninhabited islands of China
Islands of China